Sandra Sumang Pierantozzi (born 9 August 1953 in Koror) is a Palauan politician. She served as the country's Vice-President from 19 January 2001 to 1 January 2005. Pierantozzi was defeated by Camsek Chin in the 2 November 2004 vice-presidential election, winning only 28.9% of the vote. She serves as honorary consul of the Czech Republic in Palau.

Biographical details 

Pierantozzi was born in Palau and holds degrees from San Diego State University, the University of Hawaii and Union College in Lincoln, Nebraska.

In Palau she has been Minister of Finance, Senator, Vice President and Minister of Health, Minister of State, and is currently serving as Senator for the last 6 months of the vacant seat left by the late Senator Kathy Kesolei. Senator Kesolei died in October 2015. The special election in which Sandra Pierantozzi won was held in December 2015.

References 

1953 births
Living people
Vice presidents of Palau
Female foreign ministers
Finance ministers of Palau
Health ministers of Palau
University of Hawaiʻi at Mānoa alumni
San Diego State University alumni
Union College (Nebraska) alumni
Women government ministers of Palau
People from Koror
21st-century Palauan politicians
Female interior ministers
Foreign Ministers of Palau
Palauan women diplomats
Women vice presidents
21st-century Palauan women politicians